Bhargain is a town and a nagar panchayat in Kasganj District in the Indian state of Uttar Pradesh. It was established at bank of Ganga river, however the river is around 3 km far from the town now. Farming is the main occupation of locals. A large number of people has been migrated to different part of country notably to Vadodara. Bhargain has a shrine of Sufi from Chishti Order. The shrine is located near to Bhargain and easily reachable from the town. An annual urs held at Dargah. 

There are few others notable shrines are present in Bhargain. Hundreds of people from near by places visits these shrines every year.

History 
There are not many evidence available about the earlier settlement of the town, however there is a general view among the locals that their ancestors settled here around 600–700 years ago.  

Many from the town had served in military before and after the independent, notably in army of Rani of Jhansi in 1857 revolution and 53 men from the town had fought bravely in World War I in different countries.

Demographics
Bhargain nagar panchayat is divided into 14 wards for which elections are held every 5 years. The Bhargain Nagar Panchayat had population of 21,891 of which 11,222 are males while 10,669 are females as per report released by 2011 Census of India.

Population of Children with age of 0-6 is 3845 which is 17.56% of total population of Bhargain (NP). In Bhargain Nagar Panchayat, Female Sex Ratio is of 951 against state average of 912. Moreover, Child Sex Ratio in Bhargain is around 850 compared to Uttar Pradesh state average of 902. Literacy rate of Bhargain city is 52.59% lower than state average of 67.68%. In Bhargain, Male literacy is around 65.28% while female literacy rate is 39.56%.

Bhargain Nagar Panchayat has total administration over 3,132 houses to which it supplies basic amenities like water and sewerage. It is also authorize to build roads within Nagar Panchayat limits and impose taxes on properties coming under its jurisdiction. It's been noted as one of the cleanest town in the state.

Culture

Festivals 
Eid is the main festival in town. People follows the Ganga-Jamuni tehzeeb and celebrate other festivals as well with enthusiasm.

Transport 
Bhargain is directly connected with cities by road. Ballupur is the nearest railway station.

Politics 
Bhargain is part of Patiyali (Assembly constituency) and  Etah (Lok Sabha constituency). Nagar panchayat election held in every 5 years, Jaitoon bano is currently serving as chairwoman of nagar panchayat Bhargain.

Occupation 
The main occupation of people of town is agriculture. Mostly are self-employed. A large number of population has been migrated to Gujarat and involve in different kind of businesses.

Many people from the town are serving in Indian army.

Tourism 
Bhargain is famous for shrine of Sufi from Chishti Order. The Shrine is located near to Bhargain and can be easily reachable from the town. An annual urs held at Dargah .

There are few others notable shrines are present in Bhargain. Hundreds of people from near by places visits these shrines every year.

Education 
There are 3 inter colleges and 2 degree colleges in town, addition to that many primary and secondary schools are currently running in town. Despite of many schools and colleges, the literacy rate of the town is lesser than average literacy rate of the country, however there are many independent social organizations are working to educate people about the importance of education.

Health 
Town does not has a good hospital, So people has to visit other cities for the treatment.

References
https://indianexpress.com/article/political-pulse/they-refused-to-vote-because-of-kalyan-vow-to-turn-out-now-and-shut-his-son-out/

https://indianexpress.com/article/cities/lucknow/boycott-call-has-kalyan-smiling-2/

Cities and towns in Kasganj district